Robert Joseph Kurtz, C.R., (born July 25, 1939 Chicago, Illinois) is an American-born Roman Catholic bishop. Kurtz, who was ordained as a Catholic priest in 1967, and served as the Bishop of the Roman Catholic Diocese of Hamilton in Bermuda since his appointment on June 1, 1995, until his retirement on June 13, 2015.

References

1939 births
Bermudian Roman Catholic bishops
Resurrectionist Congregation
People from Hamilton, Bermuda
Living people
20th-century Roman Catholic bishops in British Overseas Territories
21st-century Roman Catholic bishops in British Overseas Territories
Roman Catholic bishops of Hamilton in Bermuda
20th-century American clergy
21st-century American clergy